Tebenna inspirata is a species of moth of the family Choreutidae. It is found in Nigeria.

References

Endemic fauna of Nigeria
Tebenna
Insects of West Africa
Moths of Africa
Moths described in 1916